Zal may refer to:

People
 Zal Batmanglij, American filmmaker 
 Zal Cleminson, Scottish guitarist
 Zal Yanovsky, Canadian rock musician
 Zal Khalilzad, former US Ambassador to the UN 
 Roxana Zal, American actress  
 Ari zal - nickname of Isaac Luria, "The Divine Rabbi Yitzhak"

Places
 Zal, Iran, a village in East Azerbaijan Province, Iran
 Pichoy Airport, Valdivia, Chile
 Iksal, Zal was older name for Iksal
 Qalay-I-Zal District, in Afghanistan

Other uses
 Zāl, legendary Persian warrior
 Iranian frigate Alborz once named after him
 Philautus zal, species of frog in Sri Lanka
 ZAL was the ISO 4217 currency code for the Financial rand
 Yeshivah Gedolah Zal,  The Rabbinical College of Australia and New Zealand
 Zonal auxiliary language, a type of constructed language